James Garfield Ellis (February 12, 1880 Dayton, Ohio – April 1, 1966 Los Angeles) was an American violinist, silent film theater pioneer, composer, lyricist, and music publisher.

Early life 
Ellis was the only male of eight children born to Jay Bartlett Ellis, MD (born 1852), and Antonette Roberts (née Hall; 1856–1896), who were married in Elkhart, Indiana, May 28, 1875. Between 9 and 16 years of age, James G. Ellis lost six of his siblings—Pauline (died 1892), Jennie (1876–1889), Maud (1878–1896), Clara (1885–1888), Mary Winnifred (1887–1888), Mabel (1889–1991)—and also lost his mother, all to complications from diphtheria.

His father became a homeopathic physician in 1891. His only surviving sister, Helen (1882–1965) became a nurse.  Helen married someone with the surname Russell and then John Joseph Allen, MD (187–1948). James G. Ellis' maternal grandfather, John Wood Ellis (1825–1917) was, among other things, an industrialist executive with the Excelsior Starch Mfg. Co. of Elkhart, Indiana. When James G. Ellis was 17, he gained a stepbrother, John F. McNair (1888–1956) when his father married Jennie Althea Standifird McNair (1867–1952) in Minneapolis on March 1, 1897.

He lived during his childhood at 1212 Wayne Street, Dayton, Ohio. Ellis served in U.S. Army in the Spanish–American War (1898).

Personal life
James G. Ellis was married three times. He first married Edna Lenore Roberts (1884–1987) in Merced County, California, November 27, 1902.  They had two daughters, Althea Claire Ellis (1909–2005), who never married, and Ruth M. Ellis (born 1917).  Ruth married Howard Paul Boyington (born 1927) in Los Angeles, California on April 4, 1966; but she formerly had married a man with the surname of Baker.  James and Edna Ellis divorced sometime between January 7, 1920, and June 9, 1921, when Edna married Robert Hassett in Lake County, Indiana. Edna and James lived in Los Banos, California in 1903. They lived at 4349 W. West End Avenue, near Kostner Avenue, Chicago between 1917 and 1920. According to the 1920 U.S. Census, Robert Hassett had been a boarder in his and his wife's home.

Sometime between January 7, 1920, and 1930, James G. Ellis married Anna G. Long (born 1876). In 1930 Ellis lived at 1090 St Andrews Place, Los Angeles and in 1940 lived at 2711 W. 14th Street, Los Angeles.

When Ellis died in 1966, he was survived by this third wife, Phyllis Ellis, who was a music teacher. At the time of his death he lived in Los Angeles at 611 N. Larchmont Boulevard.

Career

Silent film theaters 
Ellis started out as a silent film theater entrepreneur in Utah  Ellis had managed and controlled 3 movie theaters from 1909 to 1910, then sold them to individuals, including W.W. Hodkinson, who four years later was the founding president of Paramount Pictures.

Ellis and his father, who had been working at the Joie Theater in Ogden, purchased the Globe Theater in Ogden on October 1, 1909. Ellis, as the new manager of the Globe, installed a stage in late November 1909 for the inclusion of vaudeville acts for movie audiences. Ellis then moved his family from Ogden to Brigham, Utah, leaving the management of the Joie Theater to his father.

In July 1909, Ellis, with at least one other partner, acquired Dreamland Theatre, located 2410 Washington Avenue, and renamed it the Joie Theater.  Ellis, who had been profitable in the venture, sold his interest on December 28, 1909, to Harry Ambrose Sims (1864–1921), William Wadsworth Hodkinson (1881–1971), Albert Scowcroft (1871–1918), and Charles Alexander Ziemer (1864–1929).  Ellis and his wife then moved to Salt Lake City.

On March 22, 1910, Ellis filed articles of incorporation in Salt Lake County for the Ellis Theater Company, taking over the Joy theater in Brigham, the Orpheum in Park City and the Luna in Springville. The officers were James G. Ellis, president; Max M. Florence (1865–1932), vice president; John Alphonso Rugar (1883–1970), secretary, treasurer; and Soren X. Christensen (1866–1942) and Louis B. Marcus (1880–1936) as additional directors.

On May 5, 1910, Max M. Florence (1865–1932) and Joseph Falsette (born 1880) purchased outright the Ellis Theater Company and changed the name to Florence Theater Company.

Composer, lyricist, and music publisher

Ellis, as a popular songwriter in Chicago from 1910 to 1920, had some minor hits that include "The Tale the Tear Drop Told" and "I Am Dreaming Of My Irish Rose".  As a music publisher during that same period, Ellis published his own compositions, as well as those of others, including works by Roger A. Graham and Harry L. Alford.  Ellis had been a principal partner in five Chicago firms from 1913 to about 1920:  (i) The Ellis & Armitage Music Publishing Company, (ii) Ellis & Co., (iiii) Craig-Ellis & Co., (iv) Acme Music Publishers, and (v) Phenix Music Publishers.

As a songwriter of sacred music, beginning around 1917, he became an exponent of Christian Science and, around 1920, became a Christian Science practitioner.  Some of his sacred works endure today, particularly within Church of Christ (Science) congregations, including "Transfiguration", "Leave It With Him", "Rejoice, My Son, Rejoice", and "Love, Thrill My Heart".  Sometime between 1920 and 1930, Ellis moved to California.

Ellis published the works of Roger A. Graham and Harry L. Alford.

Notes

References 

1880 births
1966 deaths
American music publishers (people)
Songwriters from Ohio
Musicians from Dayton, Ohio
Songwriters from Illinois
People from Los Banos, California